Rolette County is a county in the U.S. state of North Dakota. As of the 2020 census, the population was 12,187. Its county seat is Rolla.

History
The Dakota Territory legislature created the county on January 4, 1873, with territory partitioned from Buffalo County. It was not organized at that date, and was not attached to another county for judicial or administrative purposes. It was named for Joseph Rolette Jr., a fur trader and political figure from Pembina. The county government was effected on October 14, 1884, with Dunseith as the county seat. In 1885 the county seat was assigned to Saint John, and in 1889 it was assigned to Rolla.

The county boundaries were adjusted in 1883 and in 1887. It has retained its present boundary configuration since 1887.

The International Peace Garden is located in the northwest corner of the county along the Canada–United States border with Manitoba.

Geography

Rolette County lies on the northern border of North Dakota with Canada. Gimby Creek and Wakopa Creek flow into the county from Canada. The terrain consists of dry rolling hills in the south, and more verdant low hills in the north and northwest, dotted with lakes and ponds.

Part of the Turtle Mountain plateau lies in the northwestern part of the county. The terrain slopes to the south and east; its highest point is its northwest corner, at 2,195' (669m) ASL.

The Turtle Mountain Indian Reservation is in the northeast section of Rolette County.

Major highways

  U.S. Highway 281
  North Dakota Highway 3
  North Dakota Highway 5
  North Dakota Highway 30
  North Dakota Highway 43
  North Dakota Highway 66

Adjacent counties and rural municipalities

 Municipality of Boissevain-Morton, Manitoba - northwest
 Municipality of Killarney-Turtle Mountain, Manitoba - northeast
 Towner County - east
 Pierce County - south
 Bottineau County - west

Protected areas

 Lords Lake National Wildlife Refuge (part)
 Rabb Lake National Wildlife Refuge
 School Section Lake National Wildlife Refuge
 Willow Lake National Wildlife Refuge

Lakes

 Belcourt Lake
 Bigham Lake
 Bymes Lake
 Carpenters Lake
 Coon Lake
 Gatten Lake
 Girl Lake
 Gordon Lake
 Hartley Lake (part)
 Horseshoe Lake
 Island Lake
 Lagerquist Lake
 Lake Upsilon
 Little Gurr Lake
 Long Lake
 Lords Lake (part)
 Mill Lake
 Mill Lake
 Rabb Lake
 School Section Lake
 Schutte Lake
 South Messier Lake (part)
 Ducker Lake
 Twin Lake
 Twin Lakes (part)
 Willow Lake

Demographics

2000 census
As of the 2000 census there were 13,674 people, 4,556 households, and 3,366 families in the county. The population density was 15.1/sqmi (5.85/km2). There were 5,027 housing units at an average density of 5.57/sqmi (2.15/km2). The racial makeup of the county was 25.12% White, 0.07% Black or African American, 73.01% Native American, 0.07% Asian, 0.12% from other races, and 1.61% from two or more races. 0.80% of the population were Hispanic or Latino of any race. 9.3% were of Norwegian and 7.4% German ancestry. 94.6% spoke English, 1.3% Ojibwa, 1.0% French Cree and 1.0% Cree as their first language.

There were 4,556 households, out of which 43.80% had children under the age of 18 living with them, 44.00% were married couples living together, 22.70% had a female householder with no husband present, and 26.10% were non-families. 22.60% of all households were made up of individuals, and 9.50% had someone living alone who was 65 years of age or older. The average household size was 2.97 and the average family size was 3.45.

The county population contained 36.50% under the age of 18, 9.50% from 18 to 24, 25.80% from 25 to 44, 18.50% from 45 to 64, and 9.70% who were 65 years of age or older. The median age was 29 years. For every 100 females there were 97.20 males. For every 100 females age 18 and over, there were 91.90 males.

The median income for a household in the county was $26,232, and the median income for a family was $29,744. Males had a median income of $24,288 versus $20,383 for females. The per capita income for the county was $10,873. About 28.00% of families and 31.00% of the population were below the poverty line, including 39.20% of those under age 18 and 19.60% of those age 65 or over.

2010 census
As of the 2010 census, there were 13,937 people, 4,783 households, and 3,413 families in the county. The population density was 15.4/sqmi (5.96/km2). There were 5,372 housing units at an average density of 5.95/sqmi (2.30/km2). The racial makeup of the county was 77.2% American Indian, 20.3% white, 0.2% black or African American, 0.1% Asian, 0.1% from other races, and 2.1% from two or more races. Those of Hispanic or Latino origin made up 1.0% of the population. In terms of ancestry, 48.5% were French Canadian, 7.0% were German, 6.8% were Norwegian, and 0.3% were American.

Of the 4,783 households, 44.9% had children under the age of 18 living with them, 39.1% were married couples living together, 23.2% had a female householder with no husband present, 28.6% were non-families, and 25.0% of all households were made up of individuals. The average household size was 2.89 and the average family size was 3.39. The median age was 30.5 years.

The median income for a household in the county was $28,265 and the median income for a family was $35,523. Males had a median income of $35,595 versus $27,459 for females. The per capita income for the county was $13,632. About 25.9% of families and 31.8% of the population were below the poverty line, including 41.5% of those under age 18 and 24.8% of those age 65 or over.

Communities

Cities

 Dunseith
 Mylo
 Rolla (county seat)
 Rolette
 St. John

Census-designated places

 Belcourt
 East Dunseith
 Green Acres
 Shell Valley

Unincorporated communities

 Agate
 Carpenter
 Fonda
 Kelvin
 Nanson
 San Haven
 Thorne

Townships

 Kohlmeier
 Maryville
 Shell Valley
 South Valley
 Holmes

Politics
Due to its Native American majority population, Rolette County voters are historically Democratic, more consistently so than other such counties in North Dakota. Since 1928 the only Republican to carry the county was Dwight D. Eisenhower in 1952. It was the only county in the state to support George McGovern in 1972 and is additionally the only North Dakota county to have supported Jimmy Carter in 1980. In each of the five presidential elections from 1996 to 2012, the Democratic candidate received over 60% of the vote, with Barack Obama winning 75.1% in 2008 and 74.0% in 2012. In 2016, Democratic candidate Hillary Clinton received 57.3% of the county's votes, one of the two North Dakota counties that she carried.

Education
School districts include:

 Belcourt Public School District 7 (as the Turtle Mountain Community School, in cooperation with the Bureau of Indian Education (BIE))
 Bottineau Public School District 1
 Dunseith Public School District 1
 Mount Pleasant Public School District 4
 North Star School District
 Rolette Public School District 29
 Rugby Public School District 5
 St. John Public School District 3

Former districts:
 Wolford Public School District 1 - Closed in 2019

See also
 National Register of Historic Places listings in Rolette County, North Dakota

References

External links
 Rolette County map, North Dakota DOT

 
1884 establishments in Dakota Territory
Populated places established in 1884